Ashview Heights is a historic intown neighborhood located in southwest Atlanta, Georgia, United States.  Established in the 1920s, it was one of the first planned African-American middle-class communities in Atlanta.  The neighborhood is served by Booker T. Washington High School, which is Atlanta’s first African American high school and is listed on the National Register of Historic Places. The neighborhood is in close proximity to the Atlanta University Center.

Transportation
Ashview Heights is located on the north side of Interstate 20 at the Langhorn Street exit. It is served by the Ashby MARTA station and MARTA buses.

References

Neighborhoods in Atlanta